John Henry Thompson (4 July 1932 – 29 December 2006) was an English footballer who made 50 appearances in the Football League playing as a goalkeeper for Newcastle United and Lincoln City.

Thompson was born in Newcastle upon Tyne and began his football career as an apprentice with his local Football League club, Newcastle United. He played eight matches in the First Division, and played in the 1955 FA Charity Shield, in which Newcastle lost 3–0 to Chelsea. He was third choice, behind Jack Fairbrother and Ronnie Simpson, and left for Second Division club Lincoln City in 1957 for a fee of £2,500. He played regularly during his first season with Lincoln, but lost his place to Bill Heath and others, and then moved into non-league football with Horden Colliery Welfare. He died in 2006 at the age of 74.

References

1932 births
2006 deaths
Footballers from Newcastle upon Tyne
English footballers
Association football goalkeepers
Newcastle United F.C. players
Lincoln City F.C. players
Darlington Town F.C. players
English Football League players